George Thomas is a paracanoeist from New Zealand who has competed since the late 2000s. He won a bronze medal in the V-1 200 m LTA, TA, A event at the 2010 ICF Canoe Sprint World Championships in Poznań.

References
2010 ICF Canoe Sprint World Championships men's V-1 200 m LTA, TA, A results. - archived article accessed 17 April 2017.

Living people
New Zealand male canoeists
Year of birth missing (living people)
ICF Canoe Sprint World Championships medalists in paracanoe
LTA classification paracanoeists
Paracanoeists of New Zealand